Şehzade Bayezid (1527 – 25 September 1561) was an Ottoman prince as the son of Sultan Suleiman the Magnificent and Hurrem Sultan. After the execution of Şehzade Mustafa, the heir apparent to the Ottoman throne, in 1553, Bayezid became the popular heir among the army. Throughout the 1550s, when Suleiman was already in his sixties, a protracted competition for the throne between Bayezid and his brother Selim became evident. Bayezid had fallen into disfavour with his father, who was angered by Bayezid's disobedience stemming from around the same years, as opposed to Selim, who would eventually succeed as Selim II. After being defeated in a battle near Konya in 1559 by Selim and Sokullu Mehmet Pasha with the help of the Sultan's army, Bayezid fled to the neighbouring Safavid Empire, where he was lavishly received by Tahmasp I. However, in 1561, on the continuous insistence of the Sultan throughout his son's exile and after several large payments, Tahmasp allowed Bayezid to be executed by agents of his own father.

Background 
Bayezid was born in 1527 in Constantinople (Istanbul) during the reign of his father, Suleiman the Magnificent. His mother was Hurrem, an Orthodox priest's daughter from present-day Ukraine who was the sultan's concubine at that time. At the time of his birth, Bayezid had three elder full-brothers, Mehmed (born 1521), and Selim (born 1524) and Abdüllah (born 1525) and an elder full-sister Mihrimah Sultan (born 1522). He also had one elder half-brother Mustafa (born 1515) and later one younger full-brother, Cihangir (born 1531). In 1533 or 1534, breaking a two-century-old tradition, his father freed and legally wed his mother.

As a court rule, şehzades were appointed to govern a province in order to gain administrative experience. Bayezid became the governor of Kütahya. However, during his father's 12th campaign to Nakhchivan (part of modern Azerbaijan) in 1553, he was assigned to rule in Constantinople (the capital of the Ottoman Empire) in the absence of his father. During the campaign, Şehzade Mustafa, Suleiman's eldest son and the popular heir to the throne, was executed upon the sultan's order.

The news of Mustafa's execution caused unrest in all parts of the empire, and an impostor claiming to be the executed Mustafa rebelled against Suleiman in Rumelia. One source reports that although the rebellion was subdued by a vizier, Suleiman suspected that his son Bayezid was deliberately slow to react.

However, Ogier Ghiselin de Busbecq, the ambassador of the Holy Roman Empire to the Ottoman Sultan in Istanbul from 1554 to 1562, describes the events quite differently in one of his famous letters to fellow scholar Nicholas Michault. In his letter, Busbecq describes the rise of the impostor as part of a conspiracy by Bayezid (referred to as "Bajazet" in the letter) to seize the Sultanate in order to avoid being killed by his brother Selim upon Selim's promotion to Sultan.

Competition for the Throne 
Suleiman had five sons who lived to reach adulthood. His second son, Mehmed, had died of smallpox in 1543. After the execution of Mustafa (Suleiman's eldest who had been the most potential heir to the throne) and the death of Cihangir (the youngest brother who suffered from extremely poor health) in 1553, only two princes were left to be the potential claimant to throne: Bayezid and Selim (the future Selim II). Bayezid was the governor of Kütahya and Selim was the governor of Manisa, two cities at almost equal distance from Istanbul, the capital. (Distance from the capital was important for the prince who reaches the capital had the chance of being the next sultan after his father's death)

Suleiman was in his 60s, and the competition between the two brothers over the throne was evident. Suleiman scolded his sons and decided to change their places of duty. Bayezid was assigned to rule Amasya and Selim to Konya, both provinces being further from Constantinople but still equidistant. Selim was quick to obey and promptly moved to Konya, but to the dismay of his father, Bayezid obeyed only after much hesitation. Angered, Suleiman accused Bayezid of being a rebel and supported his elder son Selim against Bayezid. Selim, in collaboration with Sokollu Mehmet Pasha (the future grand vizier) and with additional help from his father's army, defeated his brother in a civil war at Konya in May 1559.

Refuge in the Safavid Empire 

Bayezid returned to Amasya and escaped to the Safavid Empire with his sons and a small army. According to journalist and historian researcher Murat Bardakçı, Sokullu Mehmet Pasha sent an army after Bayezid, which was defeated by Bayezid's forces. In the autumn of 1559, he reached the Safavid town of Yerevan, where he was received with great respect by its governor. Some time later, he reached Tabriz, where he was welcomed by Shah Tahmasp I. Although Tahmasp I initially wholeheartedly and lavishly welcomed Bayezid, including giving magnificent parties in his honour, he later jailed him on the request of Sultan Suleiman. Both Suleiman and Selim sent envoys to Persia to persuade the shah to execute Bayezid. For the coming one and half year in fact, embassies would continue to travel between Istanbul and Qazvin. On 16 July, what would be the last of the Ottoman embassies would arrive, whose formal task, like the previous embassies, was to try to return Bayezid to Istanbul. As stated by Prof. Colin P. Mitchell, this included Hüsrev Pasha (the governor of Van), Sinan Pasha, Ali Aqa Chavush Bashi, and a retinue of two hundred officials. In the letter that was given with the embassy, Suleiman also declared his readiness to reconfirm the Treaty of Amasya (1555) and to begin a new era of Ottoman–Safavid relations. Suleiman, throughout the embassies, also gave Tahmasp numerous gifts. He also agreed with Tahmasp's demand to pay him for handing Bayezid over (400,000 gold coins were given). Finally, on 25 September 1561, Bayezid and his four sons were handed over by Tahmasp and executed in the environs of the Safavid capital Qazvin by the Ottoman executioner, Ali Aqa Chavush Bashi, through the way of garrotting. They were laid to rest in Sivas.

Family  
Bayezid had eleven children, seven sons and four daughters. Harem's records indicate that they were all half-siblings, with the exception of Şehzade Osman and Şehzade Mahmud. However, none of his concubines are known by name.

Sons  
All of Bayezid's sons still alive in 1561 were executed with their father by order of their grandfather, Suleiman the Magnificent.  

Bayezid had at least seven sons: 
 Şehzade Orhan (1543, Kütahya - 25 September 1561,  Qazvin). Described as "surprisingly beautiful", he was instructed by Abdhurrahman El-Gubari and Lala Çandarlızade Halil Bey. He was governor of Çorum between 1558 and 1559.
 Şehzade Osman (1545, Kütahya - between 1553 and 1560). Governor of Karahişâr-ı Şarkî and Canik.
 Şehzade Abdüllah (1548, Kütahya, - 25 September 1561, Qazvin).
 Şehzade Mahmud (1552, Kütahya, - 25 September 1561, Qazvin). Governor of Canik.
 Şehzade Mehmed (1558, Amasya - 25 September 1561, Qazvin).
 Şehzade Murad (? - before 1561). 
 Şehzade Fülan (1561, Amasya - October 1561, Bursa). Still a baby, he was executed by order of Suleiman the Magnificent.

Daughters  
Bayezid had at least four daughters: 
 Mihrümah Sultan (Kütahya, 1547 - Lûristân, 1602). She married Damat Müzaffer Pasha (died 1593), governor of Baghdad, Şehr-i Zor, Kıbrıs, Lûristân. She had two sons and a daughter: Sultanzade Mehmed Bey, Sultanzade Murad Bey and Hatice Hanımsultan.
 Hatice Sultan (Kütahya, 1550 - after 1558). 
 Ayşe Sultan (Kütahya, 1553 - Tokat, 1572). She married Eretnaoglu Koca Ali Pasha in 1568 and had a son, Sultanzade Mehmed Bey. 
 Hanzade Sultan (Kütahya, 1556 - ?).

In popular culture
In the 2011–2014 TV series Muhteşem Yüzyıl he is portrayed by Aras Bulut İynemli.

References

Sources
 
 
 

1527 births
1561 deaths
16th-century Ottoman royalty
Ottoman princes
Executed people from the Ottoman Empire
Bayezid
Royalty from Istanbul
Year of birth unknown
Emigrants from the Ottoman Empire to Iran
Prisoners and detainees of Safavid Iran
16th-century executions by the Ottoman Empire
Rebels from the Ottoman Empire
People executed by ligature strangulation
Executed royalty